Aldo A. Sebben (September 20, 1920 – October 7, 1997) was an American football, cross country, and track and field coach. He served as the head football coach at Central College—now known as Central Methodist University—in Fayette, Missouri from 1950 to 1951 and Missouri State University—then known as Southwest Missouri State University—in Springfield, Missouri from 1956 to 1960, compiling a career college football coaching record of 19–36–1.

Head coaching record

Football

References

1920 births
1997 deaths
American football centers
Illinois State Redbirds football players
Central Methodist Eagles football coaches
Florida State Seminoles football coaches
Missouri State Bears football coaches
Shurtleff Pioneers football players
People from Centerville, Iowa
Players of American football from Iowa